Born and Raised in Black & White is the second studio album by American country music singer-songwriter Mark Collie.  It was released on MCA in 1991. "Calloused Hands", "She's Never Comin' Back", and "It Don't Take a Lot" were released as singles.

It features a cover of the song "Lucky Dog", originally recorded by country singer Keith Whitley on his 1988 album Don't Close Your Eyes. He also covers Tex Williams' classic 1960 song, "Ballad of Thunder Road", written by Robert Mitchum and recorded by him in 1963.

The Jamie O'Hara penned song, "There Goes My Dream", would later be recorded by The Dixie Chicks in 1993 for their album, Shouldn't a Told You That.

Critical reception

Giving it 2.5 out of 5 stars, Brian Mansfield of AllMusic wrote that "The first half of Collie's second album contained some smartly written songs...but some of the first album's edge had been smoothed off."

Track listing

Production
Produced by Tony Brown & Doug Johnson
Engineered by Doug Johnson
Second Engineers: Brad Jones, Russ Martin, Graham Smith
Mixed by Doug Johnson
Digital Editing: Milan Bogdan
Mastered by Glenn Meadows

Personnel
Mark Collie: Vocals, acoustic guitars
Pat Flynn, Mac McAnally: Acoustic guitars
John Willis, James Burton: Electric guitars
Steve Gibson: Acoustic and electric guitars, mandolin, pedabro and six-string bass
 Paul Franklin: Pedabro, dobro and steel guitar
John Barlow Jarvis, Steve Nathan: Keyboards
Hassell Teekell: Organ, backing vocals
David Hungate: Electric and six-string bass
Eddie Bayers: Drums
Lance Dary, Jamie O'Hara, Jim Photoglo, Russell Smith, Harry Stinson: Backing vocals

References

1991 albums
Mark Collie albums
Albums produced by Tony Brown (record producer)
MCA Records albums
Albums produced by Doug Johnson (record producer)